The Starlet is a reality television program on The WB that premiered on March 6, 2005.

Ten young actresses lived together in a home formerly owned by Marilyn Monroe, while competing in a series of acting challenges for the chance to win a role on the WB drama One Tree Hill and a management contract with 3 Arts Entertainment.

Hosted by Katie Wagner, the girls were judged by a panel composed of actresses Faye Dunaway, and Vivica A. Fox, along with casting director Joseph Middleton. The show was a creation of Jamie Kennedy.  Jaime Pressly, Days of Our Lives Matt Cedeño, David Gallagher and Adam LaVorgna from The WB's 7th Heaven also made guest appearances. The eventual winner was 18-year-old Michelynne McGuire, with Mercedes Connor as the runner up.

The Starlet was cancelled on April 5, 2005, after the single season of six episodes.

Contestants (in reverse order of elimination)

References

External links
 Official Website (via Internet Archive)
 
Washington Post
Hollywood Reporter

The WB original programming
2000s American reality television series
Television series by Warner Bros. Television Studios
2005 American television series debuts
2005 American television series endings
English-language television shows